Joyce Grace Lamason (19 December 1915 – 16 February 2012) was a New Zealand cricketer who played as an all-rounder, batting right-handed and bowling right-arm medium. She appeared in four Test matches for New Zealand between 1948 and 1954. She played domestic cricket for Wellington.

She was the sister-in-law of Jack Lamason and Ina Lamason.

References

External links
 
 

1915 births
2012 deaths
Cricketers from Auckland
New Zealand women cricketers
New Zealand women Test cricketers
Auckland Hearts cricketers